Navenby railway station was a railway station in Navenby, Lincolnshire on the Grantham and Lincoln railway line.  The station closed for passengers in 1962 and freight in 1964 but the line remained open until it was closed in 1965 as part of the Beeching Axe.

References

Disused railway stations in Lincolnshire
Former Great Northern Railway stations
Railway stations in Great Britain opened in 1867
Railway stations in Great Britain closed in 1962